The 1946 Maryland Terrapins football team was an American football team that represented the University of Maryland as a member of the Southern Conference (SoCon) during the 1946 college football season. In their second non-consecutive season under head coach Clark Shaughnessy, the Terrapins compiled a 3–6 record (2–5 against SoCon opponents) and were outscored by a total of 193 to 136.

Schedule

Roster
The Maryland roster for the 1946 season consisted of the following players:

Robert Andrus
Randolph Bishop
Harry Bonk
Paul Broglio
Eddie Chovanes
Robert Crosland
Fred Davis
Joseph Drach
Francis Evans
Walter Fehr
Emile Fritz
Lu Gambino
Jim Goodman
Fred Jackson
Robert James
Richard Johnston
Eugene Kinney
Jim Kurz
Paul Massey
Patrick McCarthy
Tommy Mont
LaRoy Morter
Al Phillips
Bill Poling
Edward Schwarz
Vernon Seibert
Emmett Shaughnessy
George Simler
Bernie Sniscak
Adam Stuart
Vic Turyn
Jack Wright

After the season

The 1947 NFL Draft was held on December 16, 1946. The following Terrapin was selected.

See also
 Maryland Terrapins football: 1856–1946

References

Maryland
Maryland Terrapins football seasons
Maryland Terrapins football